The 2016 Vuelta a Colombia was the 66th edition of the Vuelta a Colombia cycle race, held from 13 to 26 June 2016. The race started in Cartagena and finished in Bogotá. The race was won by Mauricio Ortega.

Route

General classification

References

Vuelta a Colombia
Colombia
Vuelta Colombia